Lauchernalp is an alp and resort area in the Swiss Alps, located in the canton of Valais. Lauchernalp mainly belongs to the municipality of Wiler, with a small part belonging to the municipality of Kippel.

In winter the resort is car-free and can be reached only by cable car from Wiler.

References
Swisstopo topographic maps

External links

Lötschental-Lauchernalp (official website)
Lauchernalp on Wanderland.ch

Villages in Valais
Ski areas and resorts in Switzerland